Michaela-Marie Roessner-Hermann (born January 27, 1950) is an American science-fiction writer publishing under the name Michaela Roessner.

Biography 

Born in San Francisco, she was raised in California, New York, Pennsylvania, Thailand, and Oregon. Trained as a visual artist, she holds a BFA in Ceramics from the California College of Arts and Crafts and an MFA in Painting from Lone Mountain College, and exhibits under the name M. M. Roessner-Herman. In 1989, she won the John W. Campbell Award for Best New Writer.

Her first novel, Walkabout Woman, was a 1989 nominee for the Mythopoeic Award, and won the Crawford Award. She has also published the science fiction novel Vanishing Point and number of short stories, published in Asimov's Science Fiction Magazine, SciFiction, Omni Online, Strange Plasma, Fantasy & Science Fiction, and elsewhere. She is also the author of two historical novels, The Stars Dispose (1997) and The Stars Compel (1999), about Catherine de Medici. She lives in southern California.

She has taught at the Clarion Workshop at Michigan State University and the Gotham Writers' Workshop.

Awards
 1989, John W. Campbell Award for Best New Writer

Bibliography
 Walkabout Woman (1988)
 Vanishing Point (1993)
 The Stars Dispose (1997)
 The Stars Compel (1999)

References

External links
 Michaela Roessner's page at Brazen Hussies
 
 Michaela Roessner entry at Fantastic Fiction
 Interview with Pat Murphy and Michaela Roessner on Hour 25, August 10, 2001.

1950 births
Living people
20th-century American novelists
American fantasy writers
American science fiction writers
American women novelists
John W. Campbell Award for Best New Writer winners
University of San Francisco alumni
Writers from San Francisco
Women science fiction and fantasy writers
20th-century American women writers
21st-century American women